During the 1993–94 English football season, Wimbledon F.C. competed in the FA Premier League and finished the season in sixth place, equalling their best ever league finish which had previously been set in 1987.

Season summary
Those who thought that Joe Kinnear was too inexperienced to keep Wimbledon, the Premiership's smallest side in terms of financial resources and fan base (and without even their own home), in the top flight, were quickly proved wrong. The consistent goalscoring of striker Dean Holdsworth returned Wimbledon to their winning ways after two mediocre seasons and they quickly re-established themselves as one of the hardest-to-beat sides in England. They finished sixth in the table - equalling their highest-ever finish - and, of all the London clubs, only Arsenal finished above them. They finished higher than much more fancied sides, including Sheffield Wednesday, Aston Villa and Tottenham Hotspur. The only frustration endured by Dons supporters was what could have been achieved with a higher transfer budget and perhaps even their own home.

Kit
Ribero became Wimbledon's new kit manufacturers, while London radio station LBC became the kit sponsors. The kit saw Wimbledon wear navy shirts for the first time since 1893; they were matched with navy shorts and socks for the first time in Wimbledon's history.

Final league table

Results
Wimbledon's score comes first

Legend

FA Premier League

FA Cup

League Cup

Players

First-team squad
Squad at end of season

Left the club during season

References

Notes

Wimbledon F.C. seasons
Wimbledon